The book series Geografija Slovenije (English Geography of Slovenia), published by the Anton Melik Geographical Institute, was founded in 1998 to publish the latest findings in Slovenian geography research. It focuses on the physical, human, and regional geography of Slovenia as well as on Slovenian geographical terminology, Slovenian place names, and Slovenian thematic cartography.

References

External links
 Geografija Slovenije (Geography of Slovenia)

Geography of Slovenia
Geography books
Slovene-language books